Miu Ko Toi (Chinese: 妙高台) is a peak in Hong Kong. It is one of the subpeaks of the tallest mountain Tai Mo Shan and the fifth highest summit in Hong Kong.

Name 
The Cantonese name Miu Ko Toi (Chinese: 妙高台; Jyutping: Miu6 Gou1 Toi4) literally means "Fantastic High Lookout".

Access 
Miu Ko Toi is only accessible by foot and is south west of Tai Mo Shan. In between trail markers M150 and M151 of Tai Mo Shan Road, there is the entrance for a trail called Heung Shek Path.  Assuming that you are walking up toward Tai Mo Shan's summit, turning right when you see Heung Shek Path will lead you to Miu Ko Toi's summit.

See also 

 List of mountains, peaks and hills in Hong Kong
 Tai Mo Shan

References